Bruchsal Sportzentrum station is a railway station in the municipality of Bruchsal, located in the Karlsruhe district in Baden-Württemberg, Germany.

References

Sportzentrum
Buildings and structures in Karlsruhe (district)